The Central District of Azadshahr County is a district (bakhsh) in Azadshahr County, Golestan Province, Iran. At the 2006 census, its population was 72,603, in 17,311 families.  The District has two cities: Azadshahr and Neginshahr.  The District has two rural districts (dehestan): Khormarud-e Shomali Rural District and Nezamabad Rural District.

References 

Districts of Golestan Province
Azadshahr County